The Shooting of Dan McGrew is a 1915 silent American drama film directed by Herbert Blaché, based on the 1907 poem of the same name. It was produced by Solax Studios when it and many other early film studios in America's first motion picture industry were based in Fort Lee, New Jersey, at the beginning of the 20th century.

The setting of the original poem was a Yukon saloon during the Klondike Gold Rush of the late 1890s.

Plot

Cast
 Edmund Breese as Jim Maxwell
 William A. Morse as Dan McGrew
 Kathryn Adams as Lou Maxwell
 Ordean Stark as Nell Maxwell (child) (as Audrine Stark)
 Evelyn Brent as Nell (adult) (as Betty Riggs)
 Wallace Stopp as Nell's Husband

References

External links

1915 films
1915 drama films
Silent American drama films
American silent feature films
American black-and-white films
Films directed by Herbert Blaché
Films based on poems
Films shot in Fort Lee, New Jersey
Films based on works by Robert W. Service
Films about the Klondike Gold Rush
Metro Pictures films
1910s American films
English-language drama films